CHSL-FM (Boom 92.7) is a Canadian radio station broadcasting at 92.7 FM in Slave Lake, Alberta. It started out as an AM oldies station. The station's ownership would change over the years. Some of the station's owners included OK Radio Group, Nornet, OSG, and Telemedia. It was eventually purchased by Newcap Broadcasting (now Stingray Group).

In 1985, the station received approval by the CRTC to broadcast on the frequency 1210 kHz  and began broadcasting as CKWA in November the same year.

Some time in the 90s, the station was rebranded as Cat Country 1210 CKWA. The station was a part of a network of small town Alberta stations that featured local weekday morning shows and network announcers out of Edmonton for the rest of the time. Like its sister stations in Athabasca, Westlock and High Prairie, it was operated at a low cost and often ridiculed in the community for its poor signal, bad programming, technical problems and lack of local focus. Because of its call letters of CKWA, the station soon gained the nickname The Squaw.

However, in September 2006, NewCap officially disbanded the "Cat Country" network, and relaunched the radio station from a state-of-the-art studio as 92.7 FM The Fox. It was even given new call letters: CHSL (standing for Classic Hits Slave Lake). CHSL signified the end of Cat Country and also the end of centralization from Edmonton.

Today, CHSL is tied in heavily with its new regional head office out of Edson. It also is the only former "Cat Country" station that relaunched in 2006 with an FM signal. On May 17, 2010, CHSL was rebranded with the new name 92.7 Lake FM.

On May 15, 2011, the studio and offices were destroyed by the Slave Lake wildfire. This happened after a power outage that affected the transmitter and studio. Current broadcasts on the station's frequency have been provided by CFXE-FM in Edson.

On May 30, 2011, CHSL started broadcasting out of a new studio on Main Street in Slave Lake above a video store after engineers spent over 2 weeks working on getting them back in Slave Lake. They changed their slogan to "The Spirit of Slave Lake" at the same time.

On May 8, 2013, the station received approval by the CRTC to operate a new FM repeater at Wabasca, which will operate at 94.3 MHz.

In July 2017, the station flipped to classic hits as Boom 92.7.

References

External links
Boom 92.7
 
 

HSL
HSL
HSL
Radio stations established in 1985
1985 establishments in Alberta